The Beekman Arms Inn—formerly known as the Traphagen Tavern, Bogardus Tavern and Potter’s Tavern, and currently known as the Beekman Arms and Delamater Inn—is an historic inn located in the village of Rhinebeck, New York. It is within the Rhinebeck Village Historic District, a historic district added to the National Register of Historic Places in 1979 as a cohesive area of preserved historic buildings. In 2022 the Beekman Arms and Delamater Inn has also been a member of Historic Hotels of America, an official program of the National Trust for Historic Preservation, since 2006. The inn claims to be America's oldest continuously operated hotel.

History
In the early 1700s, William Traphagen, an early settler of Rhinebeck (then a village known as Ryn Beck), established a traveler’s inn called the Traphagen Tavern in the village.  In 1766, Arent Traphagen, the grandson of William Traphagen, relocated the tavern to its present location, where the King’s Highway intersected the Sepasco Trail. When winter closed the river, the road was the only avenue of travel. It served as a stage-house for stage coaches. Stables were erected to accommodate the change of horses. 
It has remained in operation as a hotel ever since. Around 1765, a spring near the roadside supplied a well that became the "town pump".

During the last third of the 18th century, the inn, was then known as the Bogardus Tavern. Arent Traphagen died in 1769 and the tavern was purchased by Everardus Bogardus, great-grandson of the New Netherlands dominie. It was host to many leaders of the American Revolution, including George Washington, Philip Schuyler, Benedict Arnold and Alexander Hamilton. In 1775, the 4th Regiment of the Continental Army drilled on the Bogardus lot near the tavern.

By 1785, the King’s Highway was now the country's Post Road, and in 1788, after independence, the village continued to grow. The Town of Rhinebeck, which contains the village, was organized. The current route of East Market Street was laid out the same year during construction of the Ulster-Saulsbury Turnpike, later to become Route 308. Everardus Bogardus died in 1799, and the tavern passed to his son Benjamin.

In 1802, Asa Potter bought the inn from Benjamin Bogardus. In 1804, during the race for Governor of New York State, both candidates had headquarters in Rhinebeck.  Gen. Morgan Lewis had his at the inn, then known as Potter’s Tavern, and Vice President Aaron Burr had his down the street at the Kip Tavern. Potter died in 1805. The tavern then came into possession of Captain Jacques, a former river sloop captain. It remained a rendezvous for politicians. Martin Van Buren was a frequent guest at Jacques' Tavern.

In 1918, under the ownership of Tracy Dows, the inn was extensively renovated, with a ballroom being added.  Dows's son Olin Dows, a United States Army artist who would serve in the European Theater of Operations during World War II, was commissioned to paint a mural in the Rhinebeck post office depicting the town’s beginnings.  Olin's Harvard classmate and close friend Thomas Wolfe visited the inn frequently, and his five years of prolonged stays at the inn have been said to have been the basis for what became his 1935 novel Of Time and the River.

In 1957, the inn was host to New York Governor W. Averell Harriman upon the dedication of the Kingston–Rhinecliff Bridge.

In the 1980s, a greenhouse room was added to the front of the ballroom. In 1987, the inn was owned by Charles LaForge Jr.

Notable events
The inn has been host to numerous local and national historic events, including:
Horace Greeley, a U.S. Representative and founder and editor of the New-York Tribune, was a frequent guest.
William Jennings Bryan, a Democratic nominee for President of the United States in 1896, 1900, and 1908, spoke from a second-story window to an enthusiastic gathering on the front lawn.
Benjamin Harrison and his running mate, Levi P. Morton, learned the convention had nominated them for president and vice-president while assembled with their supporters at the inn in 1888. Harrison became the 23rd President of the United States in 1889.
U.S. President Franklin Delano Roosevelt, a resident of nearby Hyde Park and a frequent guest at the inn, concluded every campaign, both for governor and for president, by giving a speech from the front porch of the inn.

See also

National Register of Historic Places listings in Rhinebeck, New York
Rhinebeck Area Chamber of Commerce

References

Houses completed in 1766
Buildings and structures in Rhinebeck, New York
Historic hotels in the United States
1766 establishments in the Province of New York
Historic Hotels of America